Samji is a lake in North Korea. The lake serves as a tourist attraction.

Etymology
The word samji means "three pools" in Korean language. The lake is formed by three ponds which are located side by side.

History
Between 1937 and 1939, the Japanese built the 120-km-long Hyesan-Musan Guard Road one hundred meters from the lake.

The lake is near the location of the Battle of Musan fought in May 1939. The battle is considered important in history of the Korean Revolution.

Samji Lake is designated as a Revolutionary Battle Site. The  there is built in honor of Kim Il-sung.

See also
Heaven Lake
Natural monuments of North Korea
Samjiyon Band
Samjiyon County

References

Lakes of North Korea
Endorheic lakes of Asia